Madelin Stefanía Riera Bajaña (born 7 August 1989) is an Ecuadorian footballer who plays as a forward for Super Liga Femenina club CD El Nacional. She has been a member of the Ecuador women's national team.

International career
Riera was part of the Ecuadorian squad for the 2015 FIFA Women's World Cup.

References

External links
 
 

1989 births
Living people
Women's association football forwards
Women's association football midfielders
Ecuadorian women's footballers
Sportspeople from Guayaquil
Ecuador women's international footballers
2015 FIFA Women's World Cup players
Pan American Games competitors for Ecuador
Footballers at the 2015 Pan American Games
Ecuadorian women's futsal players
21st-century Ecuadorian women